The laimosphere is the microbiologically enriched zone of soil that surrounds below-ground portions of plant stems; the laimosphere is analogous to the rhizosphere and spermosphere. Topographically, the laimosphere includes the soil around any portion of subterranean plant organs other than roots where exuded nutrients (especially sugars and amino acids) stimulate microbial activities. Subterranean plant organs with a laimosphere include hypocotyls, epicotyls, stems, stolons, corms, bulbs, and leaves. Propagules of soil-borne plant pathogens, whose germination is stimulated by a plant exudates in the laimosphere, can initiate hypocotyl and stem rots leading to "damping-off". Pathogens  commonly found to cause such diseases are species of Fusarium, Phoma, Phytophthora, Pythium, Rhizoctonia and Sclerotinia.

Sources
 Atkinson, T. G., et al. 1974. Root rot reaction in wheat resistance not mediated by rhizosphere or laimosphere antagonists. Phytopathology 64:97-101.
 Baker, K.F. 1957. The U.C. system for producing healthy container-grown plants. Univ.Calif. Agr. Exp. Sta. Service Manual 23.
 Hancock, J. G. 1977. Soluble metabolites in intercellular regions of squash hypocotyl tissues: implications for exudation. Plant and Soil 47:103-112.
 Johnson, L. F., and N. G. Bartley. 1981. Cotton laimosphere populations of microorganisms and their antibiotic effect on Pythium ultimum. Phytopathology 71:884-981.
 Kasuya, M., et al. 2006. Induction of soil suppressiveness against Rhizoctonia solani by incorporation of dried plant residues into soil. Phytopathology 96: 1372-1379.
 Magyarosy, A. C. 1973. Effect of squash mosaic virus infection on microbial populations around the hypocotyl and chloroplast structure and function. Ph.D. Dissertation, Univ. Calif., Berkeley.
 Magyarosy, A., and J. G. Hancock. 1972. Microbial population of the laimosphere of squash (Cucurbita maxima) Plant and Soil 37:187-190.
 Magyarosy, A. C., and J. G. Hancock. 1974. Association of virus-induced changes in laimosphere microflora and hypocotyl exudation with protection to Fusarium stem rot. Phytopathology 64:994-1000.

Soil